Julian Lefay is a programmer, video game designer and musician. Lefay was in an electropop band named Russia Heat, who charted with their single, "Tell Me Your Name". Early in his work, he worked on some PC, Amiga and NES projects, programming and composed music for Where's Waldo? and Sword of Sodan, among others.

Sometimes referred to as the "Father of The Elder Scrolls", he joined Bethesda Softworks shortly after the company's creation in 1987. He held the role of Chief Engineer there for many years, and guided the company through the creation of some of its seminal games, such as The Terminator 2029, Arena, Daggerfall and Battlespire. The Elder Scrolls deity Julianos is based on Julian. He worked briefly on The Elder Scrolls III: Morrowind as a contractor after quitting Bethesda in 1998. He also worked at Sega briefly and was the Vice President of Development at Blockbuster for a time. He was briefly involved in the production of Skullgirls.

He has said that he does not have a deep love for the products or the jobs he performs today, but he cares greatly for his work and precision in his programming. He implied that he has not visited the Bethesda Studios office in years and that he lives only a few minutes from it. He has stated the house implementation in Daggerfall was done late and was therefore underdeveloped. He was unhappy with the lack of furniture and other assets that did not make it into the final game.

In 2019, it was announced that Lefay would be working on a new open world role-playing game with former Bethesda Softworks developers Ted Peterson and Vijay Lakshman.

References

External links
 
 Julian Lefay at GiantBomb

1965 births
Bethesda Softworks employees
Danish expatriates in the United States
Danish musicians
Danish video game designers
Living people
Video game composers
Video game programmers